List of Cities and Towns in Surat Thani Province

 
Cities and towns